Neosilurus is a genus of eeltail catfishes native to Australia and New Guinea.

It is one of the largest genus of fresh water plotosid.

Species
There are currently 11 recognized species in this genus:
 Neosilurus ater (Perugia, 1894) (Narrowfront tandan)
 Neosilurus brevidorsalis (Günther, 1867) (Shortfin tandan)
 Neosilurus coatesi (Allen, 1985)
 Neosilurus equinus (Weber, 1913) (Southern tandan)
 Neosilurus gjellerupi (Weber, 1913) (Northern tandan)
 Neosilurus gloveri Allen & Feinberg, 1998 (Dalhousie catfish)
 Neosilurus hyrtlii Steindachner, 1867 (Glencoe tandan)
 Neosilurus idenburgi (Nichols, 1940) (Idenburg tandan)
 Neosilurus mollespiculum Allen & Feinberg, 1998 (Soft-spined catfish)
 Neosilurus novaeguineae (Weber, 1907) (New Guinea tandan)
 Neosilurus pseudospinosus Allen & Feinberg, 1998 (False-spined catfish)

References

 
Fish of Australia
Fish of New Guinea
Catfish genera
Taxa named by Franz Steindachner